Edward Dwight Holton (April 28, 1815 – April 21, 1892) was a nineteenth century Wisconsin political and business leader. Holton was Milwaukee's first sheriff and was a member of the Wisconsin State Assembly, but despite never holding a higher office he was influential in the early political development of the state. He was a candidate in the pivotal 1857 gubernatorial campaign, and was well known as an important leader on the subjects of abolitionism and temperance. He also had a strong influence on the development of the state through his involvement in the banking, railroad and insurance businesses.

Early life
Holton was born in Lancaster, New Hampshire, and from an early age was raised by his mother alone. At age fourteen he was indentured by her for four years as a clerk in Bath, New Hampshire. He attended ordinary public schools, but was able to achieve qualifications to teach, and when the term of his indenture expired he returned to Lancaster to teach for a year. His general aptitude and business experience as a clerk led to a job in Buffalo as a bookkeeper in the shipping department of a wholesaler. In 1838 he made a brief trip to the recently organized Territory of Wisconsin, returned home when he was disillusioned with the collapse of the real estate market (which had bubbled in 1836,) and in 1840 settled in Milwaukee for good.

Business career in Wisconsin

Early Milwaukee merchant
In November 1840, he set up his first shop in the corner of a warehouse. He soon engaged in the surging wheat business, being the first to ship wheat from the port of Milwaukee in 1841. The wheat exports from Milwaukee were trivial in 1841, leaped to 95,000 bushels in 1845, and reached 1.1 million bushels in 1849, and Holton's fortune was well endowed by this trade. In 1849 he helped establish and became president of the Milwaukee Board of Trade, which was responsible for coordinating the wheat trade.

Railroads
In 1849, Holton helped found the Milwaukee and Prairie du Chien Railroad, and served as superintendent until 1851.

Banking and other business
In 1853, he helped form the Farmers and Millers Bank (a predecessor of Firstar Corporation) and became its first president. During this period there was a good deal of turmoil in banking laws, and Holton was a key factor in rewriting legislation to settle the free-for-all laws.

Political career in Wisconsin

Abolitionism and temperance
For a period of time he was a trustee of Milwaukee when it was a village. In 1843, he was elected Milwaukee's first sheriff, running as an independent. At this early stage of his political career, Holton was already well known as an abolitionist and temperance advocate. While ordinarily these were political liabilities, he defeated future Wisconsin governor and Democrat William A. Barstow due to the fact that the Democrats were divided by an internal party squabble.

In 1845, Holton was the Liberty Party candidate for territorial representative to Congress, losing to Morgan Lewis Martin, who drew 6,803 votes to 5,787 for Whig James Collins and 790 for Holton.

In 1850 Holton was at the center of a fight over a law assigning to establishments selling liquor liability for harm caused by people who were intoxicated. The law was introduced by state senator John B. Smith and was known as the Smith liquor law. When demonstrations against the law turned into minor riots, a committee was organized to defend the law; Holton was named Chair of the committee. The outcome of the controversy had the unintended consequence that it strengthened the political position of the Democratic Party and weakened the Free-soilers allied with Holton.

Gubernatorial Candidacy

Holton was the nominee of the Free Soil Party for Governor of Wisconsin in the 1853 election.  He was defeated by Democrat William A. Barstow, but finished far ahead of Whig Party candidate Henry S. Baird.

Republican Party
Holton was one of two principal candidates at the 1857 Wisconsin Republican Party convention, when the party was still very young. The other major candidate was Walter D. McIndoe, a lumber industrialist from Wausau. Holton's abolitionist passions and his connections with the Milwaukee elite gave him strong support, but McIndoe's more rough-hewn personality resonated better with the frontier character of the state at the time. As such, they split the vote, neither able to garner a majority for the nomination. When it became apparent that the convention was at an impasse, and the delegates were released from their obligation, the votes eventually were cast in favor of the third candidate, Alexander Randall, who became the obvious compromise candidate. Randall was the first in a long line of Republican governors in Wisconsin.

Holton served in the Wisconsin Assembly in 1860, representing the Fourth Ward of Milwaukee. In 1862, President Lincoln appointed him allotment commissioner, overseeing a policy where 1/3 of each Union soldier's pay was sent directly to family back home for safekeeping, intended to prevent wasteful spending in camp. He eventually had to resign the commission due to poor health.

Semi-retirement
After resigning his commissioner of allotments, he settled into semi-retirement on his farm. In 1871 he agreed to a position with Northwest National Life Insurance, who needed help managing claims due to the Great Chicago Fire. During this time he also served on the National Board of Trade, and on the board of directors of the International Board of Lake Underwriters.

In 1879 he took a railroad trip to California. Along the way, he stopped for a visit in his namesake town of Holton, Kansas. In California, he visited Yosemite Park by horseback in early spring when snow clogged the trails and travel was difficult.

He remained active in the business community, if not in actual business. He died in Savannah, Georgia, on a return trip to Milwaukee after a visit to Florida.

Personal life
Holton married Lucinda Millard on October 14, 1845, in Dexter, Michigan. She was a second cousin of Millard Fillmore. When Edward died, he was survived by Lucinda and three adult daughters. One daughter, Mary, married Robertson James, the brother of novelist Henry James.

Legacy
Holton, Kansas, is named for him, as are Holton Hall at University of Wisconsin–Milwaukee, and both Holton Street and the Edward Holton Viaduct in Milwaukee.

References

Attributions

Further reading
 

|-

1815 births
1892 deaths
People from Lancaster, New Hampshire
Politicians from Milwaukee
People of Wisconsin in the American Civil War
Businesspeople from Milwaukee
Wisconsin Libertyites
Wisconsin sheriffs
Republican Party members of the Wisconsin State Assembly
American temperance activists
American abolitionists
Activists from New Hampshire
19th-century American businesspeople